In mathematics, a semigroup with no elements (the empty semigroup) is a semigroup in which the underlying set is the empty set. Many authors do not admit the existence of such a semigroup. For them a semigroup is by definition a non-empty set together with an associative binary operation. However not all authors insist on the underlying set of a semigroup being non-empty. One can logically define a semigroup in which the underlying set S is empty. Not excluding the empty semigroup simplifies certain results on semigroups. For example, the result that the intersection of two subsemigroups of a semigroup T is a subsemigroup of T becomes valid even when the intersection is empty. 

When a semigroup is defined to have additional structure, the issue may not arise.  For example, the definition of a monoid requires an identity element, which rules out the empty semigroup as a monoid.

In category theory, the empty semigroup is always admitted.  It is the unique initial object of the category of semigroups.

A semigroup with no elements is an inverse semigroup, since the necessary condition is vacuously satisfied.

See also

Field with one element
Semigroup with one element
Semigroup with two elements
Semigroup with three elements
Special classes of semigroups

References

Algebraic structures
Semigroup theory